This is a list of medalists from the FIS Nordic World Ski Championships in men's cross-country skiing. Bold numbers in brackets denotes record number of victories in corresponding disciplines.

18 km, 17 km and 15 km
Debuted: 1925.

Classic style: 1925, 1927–1987, 1989, 2001, 2003, 2009, 2011, 2017, 2019. Free style: 1989, 1991, 2005, 2007, 2013, 2015, 2021, 2023.
Interval start: 1925, 1927–1991, 2001–2023.

Medal table

50 km
Debuted: 1925.

50 km is one of only three events that has been contested at every FIS Nordic World Ski Championships.

Classic style: 1925–1985, 1997, 1999, 2005, 2007, 2013, 2015, 2021, 2023. Free style: 1987–1995, 2001, 2003, 2009, 2011, 2017, 2019. 
Interval start: 1925–2003. Mass start: 2005–2023.

Medal table

30 km (discontinued)
Debuted: 1926. Discontinued: 2003.

Classic style: 1926, 1954–1995, 2001, 2003. Free style: 1997, 1999.
Interval start: 1926, 1954–2001. Mass start: 2003.

Medal table

4 × 10 km relay
Debuted: 1933

4×10 km classic style: 1933–1985. 4×10 km free style: 1987. 2×10 km classic style + 2×10 km free style: 1989–2023.

Medal table

10 km (discontinued)
Debuted: 1991. Discontinued: 1999.

Classic style: 1991–1999. Interval start: 1991–1999.

Medal table

Combined/double pursuit/Skiathlon
Debuted: 1993.

Medal table

Individual sprint
Debuted: 2001.

Classic style: 2005, 2007, 2013, 2015, 2021, 2023. Free style: 2001, 2003, 2009, 2011, 2017, 2019.

Medal table

Team sprint
Debuted: 2005

Classic style: 2009, 2011, 2017, 2019. Free style: 2005, 2007, 2013, 2015, 2021, 2023.

Medal table

Medal table
Table updated after the 2023 Championships.

Multiple medalists

Boldface denotes active cross-country skiers and highest medal count among all cross-country skiers (including these who not included in these tables) per type.

All events

Individual events

Best performers by country
Here are listed most successful cross-country skiers in the history of each medal-winning national team – according to the gold-first ranking system and by total number of World Championships medals (one skier if he holds national records in both categories or few skiers if these national records belongs to different persons). If the total number of medals is identical, the gold, silver and bronze medals are used as tie-breakers (in that order). If all numbers are the same, the skiers get the same placement and are sorted by the alphabetic order.

An asterisk (*) marks athletes who are the only representatives of their respective countries to win a medal.

Multiple medals at one championship
 5 medals:
 out of 5 possible:
      1997 Bjørn Dæhlie 
 out of 6 possible:
      2011 Petter Northug 
      2023 Johannes Høsflot Klæbo 
      2017 Sergey Ustiugov 
 4 medals:
 out of 4 possible:
     1954 Veikko Hakulinen 
     1987 Thomas Wassberg 
 out of 5 possible:
     1999 Mika Myllylä 
     1993 Bjørn Dæhlie 
     1995 Vladimir Smirnov  (all four individual)
     1991 Gunde Svan 
     1995 Bjørn Dæhlie 
     1997 Mika Myllylä 
 out of 6 possible:
     2015 Petter Northug 
     2023 Pål Golberg 
     2021 Alexander Bolshunov (Russian Ski Federation)
     2019 Alexander Bolshunov 
 3 medals:
 out of 3 possible:
    1935 Klaes Karppinen 
    1941 Jussi Kurikkala  (1941 Championship subsequently cancelled)
    1933 Hjalmar Bergström 
    1939 Klaes Karppinen 
    1950 Enar Josefsson 
    1937 Pekka Niemi 
    1941 Alfred Dahlqvist  (1941 Championship subsequently cancelled)
 out of 4 possible:
    1966 Gjermund Eggen 
    1954 Vladimir Kuzin 
    1962 Assar Rönnlund 
    1970 Vyacheslav Vedenin 
    1974 Gerhard Grimmer 
    1958 Sixten Jernberg 
    1985 Gunde Svan 
    1935 Oddbjørn Hagen  (2 of 3 medals in cross country + one in Nordic Combined)
    1954 Arvo Viitanen 
    1958 Veikko Hakulinen 
    1966 Eero Mäntyranta 
    1982 Lars Erik Eriksen 
    1985 Ove Aunli 
    1958 Pavel Kolchin 
    1970 Gerhard Grimmer 
    1985 Maurilio De Zolt 
 2 medals out of 2 possible:
   1925 Otakar Německý  (one medal of two possible in cross country + one in Nordic Combined)
   1926 Matti Raivio 
   1927 John Lindgren 
   1931 Johan Grøttumsbråten  (one medal of two possible in cross country + one in Nordic Combined)
   1925 František Donth 
   1929 Veli Saarinen 
   1929 Anselm Knuuttila 
   1930 Arne Rustadstuen 
   1926 Tauno Lappalainen 
   1927 František Donth

See also
Cross-country skiing at the Winter Olympics
Cross-country skiing World Cup medalists
List of Olympic medalists in cross-country skiing (men)
List of Olympic medalists in cross-country skiing (women)

External links and references
https://archive.today/20120731171641/http://www.fis-ski.com/uk/majorevents/fisworldskichampionships/nordicwsc.html
https://web.archive.org/web/20050305075135/http://www.sports123.com/cco/index.html

Cross-country skiing, FIS Nordic World Ski Championships
FIS
List FIS